Albert Schmidt (born ) is an American politician and election official who is the Acting Secretary of the Commonwealth of Pennsylvania. He was a Philadelphia City Commissioner from 2012 to 2022.

Early life and background
A native of Pittsburgh, Pennsylvania, Schmidt graduated from Allegheny College with a Bachelor of Arts in history, and from Brandeis University with a Doctor of Philosophy in history. He served as an analyst for the Presidential Advisory Commission on Holocaust Assets in the United States (1999-2001) and the Government Accountability Office (2001-2006).

Political career
 
Schmidt moved to Philadelphia in 2005, and served as executive director of the Philadelphia Republican City Committee before stepping down in 2009 for an unsuccessful run for City Controller against Democratic incumbent Alan Butkovitz.

City Commissioner
Schmidt was first elected as a Philadelphia City Commissioner in 2011, becoming the only Republican on the three-member municipal election board by winning the one seat reserved for a member who is not part of the majority political party in Philadelphia. He was re-elected in 2015 and 2019.

Schmidt refused to cooperate with the attempts to overturn the 2020 United States presidential election by publicly refuting claims of voter fraud and resisting calls from within his own party to stop counting mail-in ballots. He called some of President Donald Trump's claims "fantastical" and "completely ridiculous allegations that have no basis in fact at all." On November 11, 2020, Trump directly attacked Schmidt on Twitter by claiming he "refuses to look at a mountain of corruption & dishonesty" in Philadelphia. After Trump's tweet, Schmidt testified that "my wife and I received threats that named our children, included my home address and images of my home, and threated [sic] to put their 'heads on spikes.'"

In late November 2021, Schmidt announced he would resign as a City Commissioner to become president and CEO of the Committee of Seventy, a nonpartisan, pro-democracy Philadelphia-based nonprofit group. On June 13, 2022, Schmidt testified before the January 6 Committee, detailing the threats against him and his family as well as addressing claims of voter fraud in Philadelphia during the 2020 election.

Secretary of the Commonwealth
On January 5, 2023, Schmidt was named by Pennsylvania Governor-elect Josh Shapiro as the Secretary-designate of the Commonwealth of Pennsylvania. The following day, on January 6, 2023, Schmidt was awarded the Presidential Citizens Medal by President Joe Biden for demonstrating "courage and selflessness" in opposing efforts to overturn the 2020 election as a City Commissioner.

Personal 
Schmidt and his wife Erin have three children: Maggie, Grace, and Max.

References

External links 
 
 
 Pennsylvania Department of State profile

21st-century American businesspeople
21st-century American politicians
Allegheny College alumni
American nonprofit chief executives
Brandeis University alumni
Businesspeople from Philadelphia
Date of birth missing (living people)
Living people
Pennsylvania Republicans
Philadelphia City Commissioners
Place of birth missing (living people)
Presidential Citizens Medal recipients
Secretaries of the Commonwealth of Pennsylvania
Year of birth missing (living people)